Fengtai County is a county in the north of Anhui Province, China. It is under the administration of Huainan city. Author Li Hengrui, whose work "Kite Capriccio" describes life as a child in the 1950s in Fengtai County is included in the Putonghua Proficiency Test.

Administrative divisions
In the present, Fengtai County has 10 towns, 8 townships and 1 ethic township.
10 Towns

8 Townships

1 Ethic township
 Hui Lichong

Climate

References

Huainan